Li Wen-ua (also known as Li Tsai-yi born 3 December 1989, Kaohsiung City) is a Taiwanese athlete. She competed for Chinese Taipei in discus at the 2012 Summer Olympics.

Competition record

References

Taiwanese female discus throwers
Athletes (track and field) at the 2012 Summer Olympics
Olympic athletes of Taiwan
1989 births
Living people
Athletes (track and field) at the 2010 Asian Games
Sportspeople from Kaohsiung
Athletes (track and field) at the 2014 Asian Games
Asian Games competitors for Chinese Taipei
Competitors at the 2009 Summer Universiade